Kepler-20d is an exoplanet orbiting Kepler-20. It has a mass and radius similar to Neptune. Despite being the furthest planet from the star, it has an orbit similar to Mercury, meaning that it is a Hot Neptune. Along with the other four planets in the system, Kepler-20d was announced on December 20, 2011.

References

Kepler-20d | Wayback Machine

Exoplanets discovered in 2011
D
20d
Hot Neptunes
Transiting exoplanets